Swamibagh Temple is a prominent Hindu temple of the Vaishnav culture in Dhaka, the capital of Bangladesh. There are many temples and an ashram managed by ISKCON, of which Swamibagh temple in Bangladesh is prominent. Every year the annual Jagannath Rath Yatra starts from here and proceeds till the Dhakeshwari National Temple.

References

Hindu temples in Dhaka
20th-century Hindu temples